South Wheatland Township is located in Macon County, Illinois, South of Decatur. As of the 2010 census, its population was 4,143 and it contained 1,861 housing units. The South Wheatland Fire Protection District consists of 5 officers; 1 Chief, 1 Asst. Chief, 1 Captain, and 2 Lieutenants, and 14 Firefighters, as well as 3 members on the Board of Trustees.

Cities and towns 
 Elwin

Adjacent townships 
 Decatur Township (north)
 Long Creek Township (northeast)
 Mount Zion Township (east)
 Milam Township (east and southeast)
 South Macon Township (south)
 Blue Mound Township (southwest and west)
 Harristown Township (northwest)

Geography
South Wheatland Township is the location of the Sand Creek Conservation Area, a 755-acre (3 km) natural area and park property of the Macon County Conservation District.

Demographics

References

External links
US Census
City-data.com
Illinois State Archives

Townships in Macon County, Illinois
Townships in Illinois